Aristobia horridula is a species of beetle in the family Cerambycidae. It was described by Frederick William Hope in 1831, originally under the genus Lamia. It is known from Myanmar, Laos, Taiwan, China, Thailand, and Vietnam.

References

Lamiini
Beetles described in 1831